Rice cyst nematode is the common name for several species of invasive plant-pathogenic nematodes:
 Heterodera elachista
 Heterodera oryzae
 Heterodera oryzicola

Animal common name disambiguation pages